Mario Maslać (born 9 September 1990) is a Serbian professional footballer who plays as a centre-back.

Club career
Maslać made his senior debut with Veternik in the 2008–09 season, before moving to Borac Čačak in the summer of 2009.

On 16 June 2017, Maslać signed a one-year contract with Irtysh Pavlodar, with his contract being cancelled by mutual consent on 26 January 2018. He joined Riga for the 2018 season.

International career
Maslać played for the Serbian national under-21 team at the Valeriy Lobanovskyi Memorial Tournament in 2011.

Career statistics

Honours

Club 
PSS Sleman
 Menpora Cup third place: 2021

References

External links
 Utakmica profile
 Srbijafudbal profile

1990 births
Living people
Footballers from Novi Sad
Serbian footballers
Association football defenders
FK Veternik players
FK Borac Čačak players
NK Osijek players
FK Vojvodina players
FC Irtysh Pavlodar players
Riga FC players
FK Belasica players
Akademija Pandev players
Serbian First League players
Serbian SuperLiga players
Croatian Football League players
Kazakhstan Premier League players
Latvian Higher League players
Macedonian First Football League players
Liga 1 (Indonesia) players
Serbia under-21 international footballers
Croats of Vojvodina
FK Radnički Niš players
PSS Sleman players
Serbian expatriate footballers
Expatriate footballers in Croatia
Serbian expatriate sportspeople in Croatia
Expatriate footballers in Kazakhstan
Serbian expatriate sportspeople in Kazakhstan
Expatriate footballers in Latvia
Serbian expatriate sportspeople in Latvia
Expatriate footballers in North Macedonia
Serbian expatriate sportspeople in North Macedonia
Expatriate footballers in Indonesia
Serbian expatriate sportspeople in Indonesia